Sergey Myasnikov (born 27 January 1967) is a Russian sailor. He competed in the Tornado event at the 1996 Summer Olympics.

References

External links
 

1967 births
Living people
Russian male sailors (sport)
Olympic sailors of Russia
Sailors at the 1996 Summer Olympics – Tornado
Place of birth missing (living people)